The Newquay Parish church of St Michael the Archangel, (also known as St Michael's Church) is located in Newquay, Cornwall, England,  United Kingdom, and is dedicated to the St. Michael the Archangel. Since 1951 the church has been designated as a Grade II* listed building. It is an active Anglican parish church in the diocese of Truro, the archdeaconry of Cornwall and the deanery of Pydar.

The Benefice of Towan Blystra formed in 2022 which brings together the churches of St. Michael’s Church, St Columb Minor & Colan, and St Newlyn East.

History

St Michael's, chapel of ease (demolished) 
In the early 19th century, when Newquay's pilchard fishery and boatbuilding industry were at their height, meetings for worship began to be held in town itself. The Baptists were the first to have a building here (in 1822) and the first Methodist chapel was built in about 1833.  But those who needed to visit an Anglican Church (Church of England) had to travel to St Columb Minor Parish Church.

The first Anglican chapel in Newquay was built in 1858 (by the Reverend Nicholas Chudleigh) as a chapel-of-ease, in a Cornish Perpendicular style; it was known as St Michaels due to the dedication of a side chapel. The Chapel officially opened on the 9th September 1858. The Newquay parish itself was created 1896 from part of St Columb Minor parish. that same year the Chapel of Ease had been twice enlarged, a north and a south aisle being added, and its capacity increased to 500. By the turn of the 20th century, it became difficult to hold the summer congregation due to the number of people attending.  The cramped and inconvenient site meant that no further enlargement of any kind was possible, and it seemed inevitable that a new large church would have to be built on a new site.

The St Michaels, Chapel of Ease continued to serve the people of Newquay until 1911 when the New Parish Church was built. After the new church opened, the land where the Chapel of Ease stood was purchased and became the Women's Institute. The land and building was purchased by FW Woolworth and was subsequently demolished for the new Woolworths store to be built in 1937. However, there is still a reminder of the fact that a church once stood here in the footpath, named 'Church Path', which runs from Mount Wise to Bank Street which is still in use today.

Newquay Parish church of St Michael the Archangel 

The new church in Newquay was dedicated to St. Michael the Archangel, was commenced in 1909.  the construction carried out throughout 1910 and eventually, after the some setbacks and some last minute issues that the necessary money would be collected in time, the church was completed and was consecrated on the 12th July 1911 by the Bishop of Truro. The total cost of the church, including the purchase of the site, was just under £11,000. The church was originally designed by Sir Ninian Comper.

Newquay Parish Church of St Michael the Archangel opened in 1911.

Sebastian Comper designed the present church tower, The tower was completed in 1969, nearly 60 years after the church was built. The Tower itself is 64.76 metres (105 feet 6 inches) in height.  It was originally intended to contain a peal of bells, but there have never been funds for this or the proposed clock either.

Vicars 

 Reginald John Yarde-Buller (1918 - 1926)
 Charles Stanley Fleet (1926 – 1934)
 Henry George Blomfield (1934 - 1951)
 Charles Kelland Peeke (1951 - 1969)
 Harold Ernest Hocking (1969 - 1974)
 John Donald Shepher  (1974 - 1984)
 Hugh Martin Williams (1984 - 1993)
 Michael Harry Fisher (1995 – 1999)
 Michael John Adams  (1999 - 2014)
 Jeremy S Thorold (2016 - 2021)

Fittings 
The Church was further modified over the years, with stained glass (some designed by Ninian Comper), by the rood screen, also designed by Comper, which was installed in sections, and by the fine organ by Nicholson of Worcester, which was dedicated in 1961, replacing an old organ of mixed origin. This was the gift of the late Revd W.P.Mitchell, as was the tower. Comper's original plans had included a tower at the east end of the church, which was never built for lack of funds at the time.

Fire 
On St Peter's Day, 29 June 1993, there was an arson attack that destroying large sections of the church. The restoration project which followed received a considerate amount of funding from English Heritage, and in collaboration with experts at  English Heritage, the practice used its expertise in architectural conservation to complete a substantial repair of the church, restoring it to its former glory. but has since been reopened (rededicated in 1996).

References 

Church of England church buildings in Cornwall
Grade II* listed churches in Cornwall
Newquay